Konstantin Nikolaevitch Tretiakoff (December 26, 1892 – 1958) was a Russian neuropathologist. He was born in Fergana, Uzbekistan, as a son of military physician, who was member of Pierre Bonvalot's first Pamir expedition. He studied medicine in L'Assistance Publique des Hopitaux de Paris. He received his doctorate in 1919. In his thesis he described degeneration of the substantia nigra associated with paralysis agitans (Parkinson disease). Tretiakof was first to link this anatomic structure with parkinsonism. Between 1922 and 1926 Tretiakoff worked at the Hospício de Juquery, near the city of São Paulo, Brazil. In 1931 he was appointed Chairman at the new Department of Neuropathology at the Medical Institute in Saratov, USSR, where he spent the rest of his life.

In 1910, Fritz Heinrich Lewy discovered what became known as Lewy bodies, and compared them to earlier findings by Gonzalo Rodríguez Lafora. In 1913, Lafora described another case, and acknowledged Lewy as the discoverer, naming them cuerpos intracelulares de Lewy (Lewy bodies). Trétiakoff found them in 1919 in the substantia nigra of PD brains, called them corps de Lewy and is credited with the eponym.  Eliasz Engelhardt argued in 2017 that Lafora should be credited with the eponym, because he named them six years before Trétiakoff.

References

1892 births
1958 deaths
Soviet neurologists
Corresponding Members of the USSR Academy of Medical Sciences
Lewy body dementia
People from Fergana
Soviet pathologists
Scientists from Saratov